The Williams Formation is a Mesozoic geologic formation. Dinosaur remains (including hadrosaurid fragments) are among the fossils that have been recovered from the formation, although none have yet been referred to a specific genus. In 1996 Gino Calvano found foot bones, two cervical vertebrae, and a phalanx (toe) from a hadrosaur in this formation, along the western base of the Santa Ana Mountains in Orange County, California.

See also

 List of dinosaur-bearing rock formations
 List of stratigraphic units with indeterminate dinosaur fossils

Footnotes

References
 Hilton, Richard P. 2003. Dinosaurs and Other Mesozoic Reptiles of California. Berkeley: University of California Press. 318 pp.
 Weishampel, David B.; Dodson, Peter; and Osmólska, Halszka (eds.): The Dinosauria, 2nd, Berkeley: University of California Press. 861 pp. .

Cretaceous California